KAOS (89.3 FM) is a hybrid college-community radio station licensed to The Evergreen State College in Olympia, Washington. It broadcasts at a power of 1,250 watts and also streams via the Internet. The station offers radio broadcasting training to students of The Evergreen State College as well as members of the local community.

History
KAOS was founded by Dean Katz of The Evergreen State College. When he traveled to Seattle to apply for the station license, his official papers had the radio station call letters as KESC (for "Evergreen State College.")  However, unbeknownst to his adviser and almost everyone else, Katz substituted the initials of the fictional spy agency in the TV show Get Smart. The license was granted under his surprise application, and broadcasts began January 1, 1973.

The station has been a mainstay in Olympia's local music scene, including a famous early appearance by Skid Row ( Nirvana ) on May 6, 1987 (their fourth public appearance and first ever radio broadcast) and a Kurt Cobain solo acoustic performance on September 25, 1990 (both included on the Nirvana box set With the Lights Out).

Programming
KAOS's mission is to present voices that are underrepresented in mainstream media. This includes Native American, Women's, Hispanic, alternative news programs, and independent music.  KAOS currently broadcasts several syndicated public affairs programs from Pacifica Radio, including Amy Goodman's Democracy Now! and David Barsamian's Alternative Radio, as well as original, locally produced public affairs shows. KAOS also features a wide variety of music, including world music, jazz, blues, metal, folk, experimental, garage, psychedelic, electronic, surf, alt country, prog, free jazz, indie rock, bluegrass, dance, dub, reggae, hip hop, Latino, roots rock, R&B, and more.

Music policy
KAOS instituted an independent music policy in its early years. The policy requires that at least 80% of the music broadcast on the station must be from sources other than the major record labels and their subsidiaries.

Long-running programs
There are a number of programs that have been around for well over ten years and are still on the air, including:
El Mensaje Del Aire: Spanish-language
Retroactive: Roots rock, R&B, Soul
View From the Shore: Native
Excuse All The Blood: Metal
American Anecdotes: Bluegrass

Former DJs
Over the years, the station has had many former DJs go onto larger fame, such as Victoria Hart Glavin (Victoria Barreca) hip hop journalist and founder of PileDriving Records, Bruce Pavitt (founder of Sub Pop Records), Chris Scofield (founder of Strange Attractors Audio House Records), Tobi Vail, Lois Maffeo, Mark Hosler (of Negativland), Arrington de Dionyso (of Old Time Relijun), Steve Fisk (producer and musician), Jeff Jacoby (sound artist & producer of The Traveling Radio Show), Tom Hood (founder of Hood's Woods Music), Calvin Johnson (of Beat Happening and founder of K Records), and John Foster (founder of OP Magazine).

KAOS was also the call sign of an unlicensed AM radio station operating in Huntington Beach, CA during the late 1960s on 880 kHz.

See also
List of community radio stations in the United States

References

External links 
KAOS 89.3 FM Olympia Community Radio
KAOS weekly program schedule

AOS
Community radio stations in the United States
AOS
Radio stations established in 1973
1973 establishments in Washington (state)